Shaun Wilkinson (born 12 September 1981) is an English former footballer who played in the Football League for Brighton & Hove Albion and Chesterfield.

References

English footballers
English Football League players
1981 births
Living people
Brighton & Hove Albion F.C. players
Chesterfield F.C. players
Association football midfielders